Timothy Tau (born Timothy Tau Hsieh; Chinese: 謝韜; pinyin: Xiè Tāo) is a Taiwanese-American writer, engineer, attorney, law professor and filmmaker. Tau won the 2011 Hyphen Asian American Writers' Workshop Short Story Contest for his short story, "The Understudy", which was published in the Winter 2011 issue of Hyphen magazine, Issue No. 24, the "Survival Issue." Tau also won Second Prize in the 2010 Playboy College Fiction Contest for his short story, "Land of Origin" (see the October 2010 issue of Playboy magazine). He has also directed a number of short films and music videos that have screened at various film festivals worldwide and on YouTube.

Writing
Tau's short story "The Understudy" is a comic-surrealist story about an Asian American actor named Jack Chang struggling in Los Angeles who must deal with the sudden emergence of a mysterious new understudy named Hyde on a production of a play (Eugène Ionesco's Rhinoceros) he is working on. It is told in the second-person narrative. The story was published in the Winter 2011 Issue of Hyphen magazine and won Grand Prize in the 2011 Hyphen Asian American Short Story Contest, sponsored by the Asian American Writers Workshop and the only national Pan-Asian American Writing Competition of its kind. Award-winning novelist Porochista Khakpour, one of the judges, called the story a "psychological thriller successfully pulled off in second person -- alone a feat worthy of mention -- and [a] cautionary tale about what happens when you entirely live for and therefore ultimately lose everything but your art. At surface glance, it can make one think 'Chinese thespian Black Swan,' but the wild, brainy, dark and dazzling prose is in a league of its own." MacArthur Fellow and award-winning novelist Yiyun Li said: "Full of vibrating energy, ‘The Understudy’ is an exciting story to read; better, the excitement does not fizz off but makes a reader think afterward." The short story was also listed on the syllabus in the upper-division level English course "Reading and Writing Short Stories" (ENGE 3290) taught by Dr. Suzanne Wong at the Chinese University of Hong Kong.

Tau's short story "Land of Origin" is a love-crime and neo-noir story about a Taiwanese American professional/ex-pat named Dante Wu who lives an empty and jaded life in Los Angeles, and who goes back to Kaohsiung, Taiwan, to get mixed up with betel nut girls (falling in love with one in the process) and a gang known as "The Heavenly Alliance." The story tracks his descent, like the Dante of The Divine Comedy and The Inferno, into the sprawling neon-lit criminal underworld of urban Taiwan. The short story won Second Prize in the 2010 Playboy College Fiction Contest. It also won Second Place in the inaugural 2015 ScreenCraft Short Story Contest, which was judged by Academy Award winning screenwriter Diana Ossana. The short story is also published at the ScreenCraft website. A feature screenplay adaptation of the short story entitled "Kaohsiung" also was a Quarter-Finalist in the 2017 Fifteenth Annual Zoetrope Screenplay Contest, judged by Francis Ford Coppola.

Another one of Tau's short stories entitled "One Traveler" also won the Gold Key award from the Scholastic Art and Writing Awards and 2nd prize in the Samuel C. Irving Prize for American Wit and Humor, given at the University of California, Berkeley. Both "One Traveler" and "Land of Origin" were additionally finalists in the 2018 William Faulkner – William Wisdom Creative Writing Competition.

Tau's experimental short story "For/Most/Of" is a triptych that is published in the 2018 book Chrysanthemum: Voices of the Taiwanese Diaspora. The story is split into three segments that respectively cover: (1) Kaohsiung, Taiwan in 1979 (the beginning of the Kaohsiung Incident or Formosa Incident); (2) Taipei, Taiwan in 2018; and (3) the high-tech hub of Hsinchu, Taiwan in the future year of 2056.

Tau has also written a play entitled "Yellow Shakespeare" and developed it as part of the David Henry Hwang Writer's Institute (DHHWI) at East West Players. The play concerns the discovery of a long-lost Shakespeare play that is the first and only Shakespeare play to feature Asian characters, and is set in the same universe as his short story, "The Understudy," as it revolves around the same fictional theater company from the short story, the Exit Ghost Repertory (the name taken from a stage direction in Hamlet and the title of a novel by Philip Roth). A staged reading of an early version of the play was held at the DHHWI New Works Festival at the David Henry Hwang Theater in Los Angeles. In 2013, another reading of the play was staged at the DHHWI New Works Festival. In 2013, Tau also held a reading of another play entitled Bros/Hos/Foes at the DHHWI New Works Festival about two Asian American actors from different backgrounds trapped in a timeless space.

Tau is also a contributing writer to indieWire's The Playlist and writes film reviews and news articles for the site. He also conducts Q&A interviews at Hyphen magazine with leading Asian American writers, film directors, actors, musicians, and artists and has them discuss their latest projects, and is also a contributing writer to Screen Anarchy (formerly Twitch Film). Tau has also taught an Introduction to Screenwriting & TV Writing course at The Writer's Center, which has been featured on DCist.

Film

Short films
Tau has also directed several short films under his production company, Firebrand Hand Creative . In 2014, Tau was named as one of "6 Young Asian American Filmmakers Who Are Shattering America's Film Bias" by Mic Magazine.

In 2018, a short documentary entitled Nathan Jung v. Bruce Lee written and directed by Tau won Best Original Script and Best Comedy Short Film awards at the Winter 2018 Asians on Film Festival. The film recounts the true story of actor Nathan Jung meeting Bruce Lee for the first time on the set of the TV show, Here Come the Brides in 1969, where Bruce played his first and last purely dramatic and non-martial arts U.S. TV role as Lin Sung in the episode "Marriage, Chinese Style." The film has also been an official selection of the 2018–2019 Asians on Film Festival of Shorts, the 2018 Taiwanese American Film Festival, the 2018 Vancouver Asian Film Festival, and the 2019 Seattle Asian American Film Festival. Upon Nathan Jung's passing on April 24, 2021, Nathan Jung v. Bruce Lee was shared and Jung's death was covered by outlets (with Tau being the source sharing the news) including Variety, Deadline Hollywood, SyFy Wire, The Independent (UK), The Daily Express (UK), News.com.au, The New Zealand Herald, NY Daily News, Heavy.com, Yahoo! Lifestyle, Daily Star Trek News, Comicbook.com, Outsider, AsAm News, iHorror, Giant Freakin Robot, and others.

In 2011–2013, Tau directed, wrote (with Ed Moy) and produced a short film bio-pic about Keye Luke (played by Feodor Chin) entitled Keye Luke, which premiered at the 2012 Los Angeles Asian Pacific Film Festival. The film was made under a Visual Communications "Armed with a Camera" Fellowship, and highlights Luke's earlier roles as the first Kato in the 1940s Green Hornet film serials and the "Number One Son," Lee Chan, in the popular Charlie Chan films of the 1930s. The film has also screened at over a dozen film festivals worldwide. The film's composer, George Shaw, won a "Best Original Score" award at the Asians on Film Festival. The film also won an Audience Award at the 2014 HollyShorts Film Festival Monthly Screenings.

"The Case"  is a genre-hybrid of a short film that melds genres such as Film Noir, Sci-Fi, Horror Camp (in the vein of Ed Wood) and Spaghetti Westerns, and which stars Max Phyo, Cyndee San Luis, Hidekun Hah and Oliver Seitz. It has screened at The Los Angeles Asian Pacific Film Festival, The San Diego Asian Film Festival, The Cannes Film Festival Short Film Corner (Court Metrage), and The Capalbio International Short Film Festival in Rome, Italy, founded by Michelangelo Antonioni.

He has written and directed a web series entitled "Quantum Cops" , a time and dimension traveling, buddy-cop action/sci-fi-/comedy that he co-created with Joshua Murphy and which stars Kelvin Han Yee, Feodor Chin, Joshua Murphy, David Huynh, and Ina-Alice Kopp. He has also written and directed a short film entitled "Incentivus" about a Writer (Archie Kao) and imagination, hallucinations and dreams. The film stars Archie Kao, Mei Melançon, Jessika Van, and Cyndee San Luis.

In 2012, he collaborated with rappers/comedians The Fung Brothers (David and Andrew Fung) and directed, produced and edited a comedy sketch film about Jeremy Lin that The Fung Brothers wrote entitled "The Jeremy Lin Effect 2 (Linsanity)" where an Asian American girl named "Babe" (played by Jessika Van) only attracted to white men (including her boyfriend, Bret, played by Scott Lilly) is suddenly attracted to Asian American men (including a student named "Jeremy", played by Andrew Fung) after seeing clips of Jeremy Lin play. The video went viral and was mentioned on The Washington Post, the Associated Press and Yahoo! Sports, and on Taiwanese News Channel CTV among other news outlets.

Music videos
In 2011, Tau directed a music video for YouTube Sensation and Singer-Songwriter-Actress Megan Lee for her second original single, "Destiny." The music video also stars Kelvin Han Yee, Megan Lee, Jessika Van, Yul Spencer and Ina-Alice Kopp.

In 2013, Tau directed the Los Angeles segment of a music video for a track from Dumbfoundead and Paul Kim entitled "No Turning Back," the song being produced and composed by CHOPS aka Scott "Chops" Jung (formerly of The Mountain Brothers) for his EP project, "Strength in Numbers," which compiles tracks from a number of leading Asian American hip hop, rap and R&B artists. In addition to Dumbfoundead/Parker and Paul Kim, the music video also starred Jennifer Field and Cindy Bru, and NY-based Director/rap artist JL Jupiter (Jeff Lek) directed the New York segment as well as edited the music video.

Education
Tau is a graduate of University of California, Berkeley (Bachelor of Science in Electrical Engineering and Computer Science), University of California, Los Angeles (Master of Science in Engineering in Electrical Engineering), University of California, Hastings College of the Law (Juris Doctor or J.D.), where he was a Staff Editor and Technology Editor on the Hastings Law Journal, and University of California Berkeley School of Law (Master of Laws or LL.M with a "Law & Technology" Certificate Focus), where he was an Articles Editor on the Berkeley Technology Law Journal. He also graduated from Torrey Pines High School in 2001.

Tau is also a graduate of the Professional Programs in Screenwriting and TV Writing from the UCLA School of Theater, Film and Television.

Legal career
Tau has also been a patent attorney practicing patent litigation and patent prosecution at law firms such as Greenberg Traurig, Foley & Lardner LLP, Seyfarth Shaw LLP, Russ August & Kabat and Loza & Loza LLP (where he was a non-equity Partner), and was recognized as a Southern California "Rising Star" by Super Lawyers magazine in intellectual property, an honor given to only 2.5% of California attorneys. He was also mentored by Alan MacPherson while starting out at the law firm of MacPherson Kwok Chen & Heid LLP, now Haynes & Boone.

He has further served as a federal judicial law clerk for the Honorable Roy S. Payne of the U.S. District Court for the Eastern District of Texas, the Honorable Kandis A. Westmore of the U.S. District Court for the Northern District of California and as a judicial law fellow or pro bono law clerk for the Honorable Michael A. Shipp of the U.S. District Court for the District of New Jersey. Tau has additionally worked as a patent examiner at the U.S. Patent and Trademark Office, where he also detailed as a judicial law clerk for the Honorable Jameson Lee, the most senior Administrative Patent Judge at the Patent Trial and Appeal Board (PTAB). He was also editor in chief of the Journal of the Patent and Trademark Office Society, the first Asian American editor in chief in the journal's century-plus history, and moreover was the legislative chair for the Patent and Trademark Office Society.

In the fall of 2021, he joined the faculty of Oklahoma City University School of Law as a tenure-track Assistant Professor of Law, where he teaches, researches and writes scholarship about Intellectual Property Law, Patent Law, Trademark Law, Copyright Law, Trade Secret Law, Blockchain Law, Internet, Social Media & Computer Law, Artificial Intelligence Law, Antitrust Law, Entertainment Law, Law & Technology, Law & Literature/Film, Asian American Legal Studies and Representation in Media, among other topics.

Filmography

Short films
Nathan Jung v. Bruce Lee (2018) – Writer, director, producer, editor
Keye Luke (2012) – Writer, director, producer, editor
The Jeremy Lin Effect II: Linsanity (2012) – Director, Producer, Editor
Incentivus (2011) – Writer, Director, Producer, Editor
Quantum Cops: Law & Chicoban (2011) – Writer, Director, Producer
The Case (2010) – Writer, Director, Producer

Music videos
No Turning Back – Feat. Dumbfoundead, Paul Kim & CHOPS (2013) – Writer, director, producer
Megan Lee's Destiny (2011) – Writer, director, producer, editor

Bibliography

Short fiction
"For/Most/Of," published in Chrysanthemum: Voices of the Taiwanese Diaspora, pg. 30 (2018)
"The Understudy" (2011), Hyphen, Winter 2011, pg. 74
Grand Prize, 2011 Hyphen Asian American Writers' Workshop Short Story Contest
"Land of Origin" (2010)
2nd Prize, 2010 Playboy College Fiction Contest (listed in the October 2010 issue of Playboy, pg. 47)
2nd Prize, 2015 ScreenCraft Short Story Contest (judged by Academy Award winner Diana Ossana)
Finalist, 2018 William Faulkner – William Wisdom Creative Writing Competition, Pirate's Alley Faulkner Society
"One Traveler" (2003)
Gold Key Prize, Scholastic Art and Writing Awards (2001–2002)
2nd Prize Samuel C. Irving Prize for American Wit and Humor (2003–2004)
Finalist, 2018 William Faulkner – William Wisdom Creative Writing Competition, Pirate's Alley Faulkner Society

Plays
Bros/Hos/Foes (2013) – Play, developed for the David Henry Hwang Writer's Institute (DHHWI) at East West Players
Yellow Shakespeare (2012) – Play, also developed at the DHHWI

References

External links 
 

Living people
21st-century American novelists
American male novelists
American short story writers
University of California, Berkeley alumni
University of California, Los Angeles alumni
People from Torrance, California
Year of birth missing (living people)
University of California, Hastings College of the Law alumni
American writers of Chinese descent
American film directors of Taiwanese descent
Film directors from California
Taiwanese film directors
American male short story writers
American patent attorneys
American writers of Taiwanese descent
21st-century American male writers